Sakhalin Island is a 1954 Soviet documentary film directed by Eldar Ryazanov and Vasiliy Katanyan.

Plot 
The film tells the story, shows the nature and inhabitants of Sakhalin Island.

Starring 
 Leonid Khmara as Narrator (voice)

References

External links 
 

1954 films
Soviet documentary films
1950s Russian-language films
Sakhalin
1954 documentary films